The Heavenly Kingdom of the Great Mingshun, or the Shuntian Kingdom, was an attempt by members of the Revive China Society to establish a Westernized constitutional monarchy with references to the Taiping Heavenly Kingdom in 1903, founders of whom were Tse Tsan-tai, Li Ki-tong, and Hong Quanfu, a former Taiping general.

Description 
The name of the Heavenly Kingdom connotates major anti-Manchu ideals and also bears reference to the former Taiping Heavenly Kingdom, whose ripples of its own rebellion is still felt by the turn of the century. The daming 大明 means the revival of the Ming dynasty (a sentiment shared by many Chinese secret societies at the time), shuntian 順天 refers to the proverb 順天應時 (to follow the mandate of heaven and comply with the popular wishes of the people), and tianguo 天國 is a nod to the Taiping; a kingdom of God among mortals. Even though much of the Shuntian Kingdom draws inspiration from the Taiping, unlike the dictatorship-esque government Hong Xiuquan established, the Shuntian Kingdom advocated for a constitutional monarchy and a democratic republic, like the United Kingdom and the United States respectively. It advocated to return the government to the people through elections and emphasized all men were created equal, all the while retaining the core of Chinese culture and tradition.

Almost all organizers of the Heavenly Kingdom were Christians and had ties to the Chinese triads. As they were baptized by Western missionaries and had extensive contact with Western ideals, they strove to reform China with Western-style education. For example, Yung Wing, the interim president, received a Western, Christian education in the United States. Upon returning to China, he felt the deep chasm between Chinese and American ideals and strove to "transform" China with civilization, an ambition shared by many others among him.

History 
On August 14, 1901, Tse Tsan-tai, Li Ki-tong, and Hong Quanfu convened to discuss plans for an uprising in Tse's apartment. Quanfu agreed to raise approximately 500 thousand yuan and convene the Hongmen in Guangdong to support the cause, and named the uprising the Shuntian; Tsan-tai proposed to occupy Guangzhou and call on Yung Wing to be the interim president; Ki-tong promised to bear all militarist capabilities of the state. The main headquarters were set up on D'Aguilar Street in Hong Kong, and multiple branch offices were set up through Guangzhou. Quanfu thus became the Shuntian Kingdom's General of Southern Guangdong, the triad leader Liang Muguang became Commander-in-Chief, and Ki-tong became the leader of the General Staff.

The main plan was to detonate a large amount of explosives in the Wanshou Palace in Guangdong, and after more than a year of preparations, the explosives indeed killed numerous officials celebrating the Chinese New Year in the palace on January 28, 1903. However, an anonymous tip was sent to the Hong Kong police department two or three days before the scheduled uprising, and news of the intended uprising leaked out. Letters about the delivery route, storage info, and the receiving men were seized. At the same time, Ki-tong ordered ammunition from the foreign companies in Hong Kong, who reported the case to the Guangzhou officials when the money failed to deliver on time, and in the end, arms given by Muguang and Quanfu were either intercepted by villagers or policemen. Many branch offices were raided by Qing officials shortly after, and more than 20 people associated with the revolutionary state were arrested. Several more strongholds were broken through under the orders of a thorough investigation by the Viceroy of Liangguang. Hong Quanfu, upon hearing the failure of the uprising in Xiangshan, cut his beard and fled to Singapore.

Legacy 
The Shuntian Kingdom uprising is the last major uprising established by Western-educated Chinese Christians in the late Qing Dynasty, though Christians would continue to play an integral row in future revolutions. The uprising also helped to establish a much clearer line between the Chinese populace and the Qing government, with the ideas of revolution becoming more favorable among the intellectuals, students, and soldiers of Guangdong and beyond.

References 

Taiping Heavenly Kingdom
Former countries in Chinese history
States and territories established in 1903
States and territories disestablished in 1903
20th century in China
20th-century rebellions
Rebellions in the Qing dynasty
Christianity in China
Former theocracies
Civil wars involving the states and peoples of Asia
Civil wars of the Industrial era
Monarchism in China
History of Hong Kong
History of Guangzhou
Self-proclaimed monarchy
Former monarchies